The Extremists may refer to:

 Extremists (comics), a team of supervillains in DC Comics Justice League titles
 The Extremists (play), a 2009 play by C.J. Hopkins
 The Extremists (professional wrestling), a professional wrestling tag team